The finals and the qualifying heats of the Men's 200 metres Backstroke event at the 1997 FINA Short Course World Championships were held on the second day of the competition, on Friday 18 April 1997 in Gothenburg, Sweden.

Finals

Qualifying heats

Remarks

See also
1996 Men's Olympic Games 200m Backstroke
1997 Men's European LC Championships 200m Backstroke

References
 Results

B